Rahid Amirguliyev (born on 1 September 1989) is  an Azerbaijani professional footballer who plays as a midfielder for Azerbaijan Premier League side Sabail FK.

Career
On 21 December 2015, Amirguliyev signed a 2.5-year contract with Qarabağ FK.

On 24 May 2018, Qarabağ announced that Amirguliyev had been released by the club following the expiration of his contract. On 26 May 2018, Sabail FK announced the signing of Amirguliyev.

Career statistics

Club

National team

International goals

Honours

Club
Khazar Lankaran
Azerbaijan Premier League (1): 2006–07
Azerbaijan Cup (3): 2006–07, 2007–08, 2010–11
Azerbaijan Supercup (1): 2013
CIS Cup (1): 2008

Qarabağ FK
Azerbaijan Premier League (2): 2015–16, 2016–17
Azerbaijan Cup: (1) 2015–16

Individual
Azerbaijani Footballer of the Year: 2015

References

External links
 
 Profile on official club website

1989 births
Living people
Association football midfielders
Azerbaijani footballers
Azerbaijan international footballers
Azerbaijani Shia Muslims
Khazar Lankaran FK players
Qarabağ FK players
Sabail FK players
Azerbaijan Premier League players
People from Qusar